Chandler Belden Beach (1839–1928) was an American entrepreneur and encyclopedist. He founded the publishing company C. B. Beach & Company, later renamed F. E. Compton & Co. after his associate Frank Compton took it over,

Beach also served as a captain in the American Civil War. As a sales agent in Chicago for the Encyclopædia Britannica, he soon realized there was a market demand for a more light-weight encyclopedia.

Works
Beach was the editor and publisher of Youth's Cyclopedia (2 volumes, 1892) and the Student's Cyclopaedia (2 volumes, 1893), which turned into The Student's Reference Work (1901).

The New Student's Reference Work was published by C. B. Beach & Company (1909,1911,1912), then by F. E. Compton & Co. from 1912.

Legacy
Frank Compton was his associate since 1894, and became the general manager of C. B. Beach & Company in 1905. Compton took over the publishing firm when Beach retired in 1907, and the name of the company later changed to F. E. Compton & Co..

F. E. Compton & Co. went on to produce Compton's Pictured Encyclopedia in 1922.

Publishing rights to the F.E. Compton & Company products were acquired by Encyclopædia Britannica, Inc. in 1961, and the encyclopedia is still in print as Compton's by Britannica.

Gallery

References

External links

The New Student's Reference Work, 5 volumes, 1914, digitized at Wikisource

1839 births
1928 deaths
American encyclopedists
American publishers (people)